"Ligo Ligo" is a single released by Antique.

Track listing
 "Ligo Ligo" (Eric S Radio) - 3:26
 "Ligo Ligo" (Original Radio) - 3:41
 "Ligo Ligo" (Wonder Mix) - 7:51
 "Ligo Ligo" (Eric S Extended) - 6:16
 "Ligo Ligo" (M 12 Remix) - 5:49

Release history

Charts
"Ligo Ligo" entered the Swedish Top 60 Singles Chart on the week of September 7, 2001 at number 54. It stayed on the chart for four weeks straight peaking at number 48 in its second week.

References

2001 singles
Antique (band) songs
Greek-language songs
Songs written by Alex P
2001 songs
Bonnier Music singles